Route 136 (R-136), formerly Autoroute 720, known as the Ville-Marie Expressway (English) or Autoroute Ville-Marie (French) is an Autoroute highway in the Canadian province of Quebec that is a spur route of Autoroute 20 in Montreal. Its western terminus is located at the Turcot Interchange, a junction with Autoroute 15 and Autoroute 20, and its eastern terminus is near the Jacques Cartier Bridge (Route 134), where the highway merges with Notre-Dame Street. The Autoroute Ville-Marie designation is named after the downtown borough of Ville-Marie, through which the expressway is routed. It was designated Autoroute 720 until 2021 when it was renamed to Route 136.

Part of R-136 runs underground (below grade) through Downtown Montreal. This section begins from the west at Rue Guy (exit 4: Rue de la Montagne / Rue Atwater) and remains underground almost all the way to its eastern end, except for a short section between Rue Saint-Urbain and Rue Hôtel-de-Ville. The tunnelled section west of this gap is known as the Ville-Marie Tunnel, and the section east of it is known as Viger Tunnel. However, locals regard both tunnels as one, and the term Ville-Marie Tunnel is often used to refer to both tunnels.

History

It was originally envisioned that Autoroute 20 would extend from the Turcot Interchange, along the route of the 720, to the Louis Hippolyte Lafontaine Bridge-Tunnel. Indeed, when the first section of the expressway was constructed and opened in the early 1970s, many Montrealers, anticipating that it would eventually replace the Metropolitan Expressway as the primary connector route to the Lafontaine Tunnel, and onward to Quebec City, dubbed the then-unnamed roadway the "Downtown Trans-Canada Highway". The provincial transport ministry (Le ministère des Transports du Québec, or MTQ) had planned to extend the Viger Tunnel east to Autoroute 25 at its Souligny Avenue interchange. The right-of-way has existed since the original layout of the A-720, and buildings along the extension were demolished at that time, even though the 720 was not completed due to cost constraints. The government of Montreal instead converted the portion of Rue Notre Dame east of the Jacques Cartier Bridge into a six-lane urban boulevard, rather than continue a sunken limited-access expressway. The final project was approved, and work began on Souligny Avenue to double the span of the travel lanes.

In 2007, working crews for Transports Québec discovered major cracks in a support pillar and closed several lanes of the expressway. Transports Quebec announced on August 10, 2007, major repair projects for a large section of the Expressway west of the Ville-Marie tunnel.

On July 31, 2011, part of the roof of the Ville-Marie Tunnel collapsed, sending large chunks of concrete to the road below. This incident occurred at a time with little traffic and no vehicles were damaged. Several construction workers were on site at the time and were unharmed. The tunnel had to be closed for repair of the roof and several other parts of the tunnel. Transport Minister Sam Hamad announced on Friday, August 5 that the tunnel would re-open the following day.

In 2021, the A-720 was renamed to Route 136 due to the highway having reduced lane sizes following the reconstruction of the Turcot Interchange.

Exit list

Gallery

References

External links

a-720 at motorways-exits.com
Ville Marie Autoroute (A-720) at Steve Anderson's montrealroads.com
 Transports Quebec Map 

136
Roads in Montreal
1972 establishments in Quebec